In the mathematical theory of knots, a satellite knot is a knot that contains an incompressible, non boundary-parallel torus in its complement. Every knot is either hyperbolic, a torus, or a satellite knot. The class of satellite knots include composite knots, cable knots, and Whitehead doubles.  A satellite link is one that orbits a companion knot K in the sense that it lies inside a regular neighborhood of the companion.

A satellite knot  can be picturesquely described as follows: start by taking a nontrivial knot  lying inside an unknotted solid torus . Then tie up the solid torus into a nontrivial knot.

The central core curve of the solid torus  is sent to a knot , which is called the "companion knot" and is thought of as the planet around which the "satellite knot"  orbits. Composite knots contain a certain kind of incompressible torus called a swallow-follow torus, which can be visualized as swallowing one summand and following another summand.  

Since  is an unknotted solid torus,  is a tubular neighbourhood of an unknot .  The 2-component link  together with the embedding  is called the pattern associated to the satellite operation.

Said another way, given any two disjoint curves ,  preserves their linking numbers i.e.:  .

Basic families

When  is a torus knot, then  is called a cable knot. Examples 3 and 4 are cable knots. The cable constructed with given winding numbers (m,n) from another knot K, is often called the (m,n) cable of K.

Another way to say this is that the pattern  is the connect-sum of a non-trivial knot  with a Hopf link.

If the link  is the Whitehead link,  is called a Whitehead double.  If  is untwisted,  is called an untwisted Whitehead double.

Examples

 The connect-sum of a figure-8 knot and trefoil.
 Untwisted Whitehead double of a figure-8.
 Cable of a connect-sum.
 Cable of trefoil.
 5 and 6 are variants on the same construction. They both have two non-parallel, non-boundary-parallel incompressible tori in their complements, splitting the complement into the union of three manifolds. In 5, those manifolds are: the Borromean rings complement, trefoil complement, and figure-8 complement. In 6, the figure-8 complement is replaced by another trefoil complement.

Origins
In 1949  Horst Schubert proved that every oriented knot in  decomposes as a connect-sum of prime knots in a unique way, up to reordering, making the monoid of oriented isotopy-classes of knots in  a free commutative monoid on countably-infinite many generators.  Shortly after, he realized he could give a new proof of his theorem by a close analysis of the incompressible tori present in the complement of a connect-sum.  This led him to study general incompressible tori in knot complements in his epic work Knoten und Vollringe, where he defined satellite and companion knots.

Follow-up work

Schubert's demonstration that incompressible tori play a major role in knot theory was one several early insights leading to the unification of 3-manifold theory and knot theory. It attracted Waldhausen's attention, who later used incompressible surfaces to show that a large class of 3-manifolds are homeomorphic if and only if their fundamental groups are isomorphic.  Waldhausen conjectured what is now the Jaco–Shalen–Johannson-decomposition of 3-manifolds, which is a decomposition of 3-manifolds along spheres and incompressible tori. This later became a major ingredient in the development of geometrization, which can be seen as a partial-classification of 3-dimensional manifolds.  The ramifications for knot theory were first described in the long-unpublished manuscript of Bonahon and Siebenmann.

Uniqueness of satellite decomposition
In Knoten und Vollringe, Schubert proved that in some cases, there is essentially a unique way to express a knot as a satellite.  But there are also many known examples where the decomposition is not unique. With a suitably enhanced notion of satellite operation called splicing, the JSJ decomposition gives a proper uniqueness theorem for satellite knots.

See also
 Hyperbolic knot
 Torus knot

References